Seoul Nat'l Univ. of Education Station is a station in the Seocho District of Seoul, on Seoul Subway Line 2 and Line 3. It is usually noted on station signs and on-board announcements that the station serves (the Supreme) Court & Prosecutors' Office.

The station is a transfer point between the circular Line 2 (the busiest line on the network) which runs east–west at this point, and the north-south Line 3. The station is an extremely busy transfer point for those travelling between central Seoul and Gangnam district, Teheran Valley and the COEX/KWTC complex.

The station is commonly referred to as "Kyodae" or "Gyodae".

The Seoul National University of Education is located nearby.

Station layout

Gallery

References

Seoul Metropolitan Subway stations
Metro stations in Seocho District
Railway stations opened in 1982
1982 establishments in South Korea
Seoul Subway Line 3
Seoul Subway Line 2